Brad Jamieson (born 16 March 1978) is an Australian former sprinter who competed in the 2000 Summer Olympics. He also won the Bay Sheffield in 1998.

References

1978 births
Living people
Australian male sprinters
Olympic athletes of Australia
Athletes (track and field) at the 2000 Summer Olympics
Athletes (track and field) at the 1998 Commonwealth Games
Commonwealth Games competitors for Australia
20th-century Australian people
21st-century Australian people